The 1963 Alberta general election was held on June 17, 1963, to elect members of the Legislative Assembly of Alberta.

The Social Credit Party, led by Ernest C. Manning, won its eighth consecutive term in government, winning roughly the same number of seats in the legislature and share of popular vote that it had in the 1959 election.

Some Social Credit supporters were so confident of their party's chances that they talked of winning "63 in '63", i.e., all 63 seats in the legislature in the 1963 election. They fell short of this goal, but still had an overwhelming majority, reducing the opposition to only three MLAs in total.  Indeed, as a share of the overall seats available, this represented Social Credit's greatest victory in its 36-year reign.

Much of the opposition vote shifted away from the Progressive Conservative Party, now led by Milt Harradence, resulting in the party losing its sole seat.

The Liberal Party was a partial beneficiary of the PC Party's decline, but picked up only one additional seat, for a total of two, despite winning almost 20% of the popular vote.

New Democratic Party candidates received 9 percent of the vote but no seats.

1963 was the last year in Alberta provincial politics when an MLA was acclaimed with the acclamation of Leonard Halmrast in Taber-Warner.

After the PCs won power, they would later speak of "79 in '79".

Results

Notes:

1 The Cooperative Commonwealth Federation adopted the name "New Democratic Party" for the 1963 and subsequent elections.

2 The "Labour Progressive Party" returned to its original "Communist Party of Alberta" name for the 1963 and subsequent elections.

* Party did not nominate candidates in the previous election.

Results by riding

|-
|Alexandra|||
|Anders O. Aalborg3,28466.30%
|
|
|
|
|
|John C. Sandercock52910.68%
|
|W. Slim Thorpe (Con-Lib)1,13422.92%
||
|Anders O. Aalborg
|-
|Athabasca|||
|Antonio Aloisio2,24150.43%
|
|Dave Hunter1,82741.11%
|
|
|
|Judith Johnston2235.02%
|
|Trygve Hansen (Comm.)1182.66%
||
|Antonio Aloisio
|-
|Banff-Cochrane
|
|Victor Watson1,87842.68%
|
|
|
|
|
|Jack Fraser3317.52%
||
| Frank L. Gainer (Coal)2,17949.66%
||
|Francis Leo Gainer
|-
|Bonnyville|||
|Romeo B. Lamothe2,22247.91%
|
|Albert Turcotte1,05922.83%
|
|Victor E. Justik1,09123.52%
|
|Peter G. Forman2555.50%
|
||||
|Karl Earnest Nordstrom
|-
|Bow Valley-Empress|||
|William Delday2,87160.19%
|
|George Timko92319.35%
|
|George A. Simpson97220.38%
|
|
|
||||
|William Delday
|-
|Calgary Bowness|||
|Charles E. Johnston5,35552.11%
|
|Peter Petrasuk2,45623.90%
|
|Albert A. Frawley1,71916.73%
|
|Everett C. Baldwin7357.15%
|
||||
|Charles E. Johnston
|-
|Calgary-Centre|||
|Frederick C. Colborne4,39561.22%
|
|E. Virgil Anderson1,87826.16%
|
|
|
|Mrs. Melba Cochlan75710.54%
|
|Dave Raichman (Comm.)1011.41%
||
|Frederick C. Colborne
|-
|Calgary-East|||
|Albert W. Ludwig4,76360.23%
|
|Evelyn Leew6778.56%
|
|Bill Duncan1,49718.93%
|
|Dick Dunlop95312.05%
|
||||
|
|-
|Calgary-Glenmore
|
|A. Ross Lawson4,26831.40%|||
|William Daniel Dickie6,03744.42%
|
|Ned Corrigal2,89121.27%
|
|G.A.J. Otjes3742.75%
|
||||
|Ernest S. Watkins
|-
|Calgary-North|||
|Robert A. Simpson4,71356.82%
|
|Robert F. Goss7949.57%
|
|Larry B. Nugent2,12325.59%
|
|Steven P. Galan6477.80%
|
||||
|Rose Wilkinson
|-
|Calgary Queens Park|||
|Lea Leavitt4,36348.19%
|
|John Donnachie96110.61%
|
|Duncan Lovell McKillop1,59717.64%
|
|Ben S. Greenfield5095.62%
|
|Roy Alexander Farran (Ind.)1,46916.22%Conrad Pfeifer (Ind. SoCred)1261.39%|||
|
|-
|Calgary-South|||
|Arthur J. Dixon5,66160.51%
|
|Howard G. Cook2,52927.03%
|
|
|
|John N. Smith1,12312.00%
|
||||
|
|-
|Calgary-West|||
|Donald S. Fleming5,18342.76%
|
|Ted Duncan2,25018.56%
|
|Asa Milton Harradence4,10933.90%
|
|Jack D. Peters5684.69%
|
||||
|Donald S. Fleming
|-
|Camrose|||
|Chester I. Sayers3,42756.57%
|
|James P. Richardson74612.31%
|
|Ernest Moore1,51925.07%
|
|Kenneth Nelson3565.88%
|
||||
|Chester I. Sayers
|-
|Cardston|||
|Edgar W. Hinman2,52768.00%
|
|John Fenton Webster1,03527.85%
|
|
|
|Collin H. Holt1504.04%
|
||||
|Edgar W. Hinman
|-
|Clover Bar|||
|Floyd M. Baker3,73057.65%
|
|James P. O'Dwyer79112.23%
|
|Daniel F. Hollands1,40721.75%
|
|Paul Arthur Dorin5358.27%
|
||||
|Floyd M. Baker
|-
|Cypress|||
|Harry E. Strom3,03077.71%
|
|Alvin H. Reiman86122.08%
|
|
|
|
|
||||
|Harry E. Strom
|-
|Drumheller-Gleichen|||
|Gordon Edward Taylor4,56586.07%
|
|
|
|
|
|Irene Dyck72013.57%
|
||||
|
|-
|Dunvegan|||
|Ernest L. Lee1,30652.45%
|
|M.H. (Milt) Connery84934.10%
|
|
|
|Roy A. Mitchell32513.05%
|
||||
|Joseph M. Scruggs
|-
|Edmonton_North|||
|Ethel Sylvia Wilson4,65552.17%
|
|Thomas O'Dwyer2,48927.90%
|
|
|
|William H. Nash1,74319.54%
|
||||
|Ethel Sylvia Wilson
|-
|Edmonton-Centre|||
|Ambrose Holowach3,37847.56%
|
|Joseph A. Tannous1,21917.16%
|
|Gerard Joseph Amerongen1,49221.01%
|
|Alex Szchechina99313.98%
|
||||
|Ambrose Holowach
|-
|Edmonton-Jasper Place|||
|John William Horan3,63945.14%
|
|Keith C. Campbell2,23427.71%
|
|Clarence Edgar Sage1,03412.83%
|
|Patrick J. Ryan1,12813.99%
|
||||
|
|-
|Edmonton-North East|||
|Lou W. Heard4,02342.66%
|
|Ken McAuley1,29513.73%
|
|Allan Welsh1,51016.01%
|
|Neil Reimer2,58927.45%
|
||||
|Lou W. Heard
|-
|Edmonton-North West|||
|Edgar H. Gerhart4,36945.97%
|
|Edmund H. Leger1,85419.51%
|
|Ned Feehan1,87819.76%
|
|Grant W. Notley1,39114.64%
|
||||
|Edgar H. Gerhart
|-
|Edmonton-Norwood|||
|William Tomyn3,90547.86%
|
|J. Laurier Picard1,62819.95%
|
|J. Gordon Ozarko1,19014.58%
|
|Robert W. Douglas1,33016.30%
|
|Walter Makowecki (Comm.)931.14%
||
|William Tomyn
|-
|Edmonton-West|||
|Stanley Gordon Geldart3,73341.83%
|
|Robert A. Doyle2,57228.82%
|
|Tony Nugent2,01922.62%
|
|Neil R. Larsen5856.55%
|
||||
|
|-
|Edson|||
|Norman Alfred Willmore2,66856.16%
|
|Bertram E. Schoeppe1,37128.86%
|
|
|
|James D. Torgersen70114.75%
|
||||
|Norman Alfred Willmore
|-
|Grande Prairie|||
|Ira McLaughlin4,76372.94%
|
|Ed. Kimpe99715.27%
|
|
|
|Charles A. Evaskevich76211.67%
|
||||
|Ira McLaughlin
|-
|Grouard|||
|Roy Ells3,83262.38%
|
|Gunner Wahlstrom1,59525.96%
|
|
|
|Clif. I. Tollefson67410.97%
|
||||
|Roy Ells
|-
|Hand Hills-Acadia|||
|Clinton Keith French3,21561.77%
|
|
|
|
|
|
|
|Lyall Alexander Curry (Ind.)1,97237.89%|||
|
|-
|Lac La Biche
|
|Elvin J. Woynarowich1,47936.11%|||
|Michael Maccagno1,80944.17%
|
|Henry T. Thompson2606.35%
|
|Henry Tomaschuk2977.25%
|
|Rudolph Michetti (Ind. SoCred)2466.01%|||
|Michael Maccagno
|-
|Lac Ste. Anne|||
|William Patterson2,77751.94%
|
|Douglas P. McKeen1,79433.55%
|
|
|
|John Liss1,47427.57%
|
||||
|William Patterson
|-
|Lacombe|||
|Allan Russell Patrick3,40569.22%
|
|John Paul Fehrenbach77615.78%
|
|
|
|John Liss1,47429.97%
|
||||
|Allan Russell Patrick
|-
|Leduc|||
|James D. Henderson1,89839.74%
|
|Ronald John Hayter4619.65%
|
|Peter Wyllie97120.33%
|
|Andrew Simon Borys61312.84%
|
|Ronald Earl Ansley (Ind. SoCred)73115.31%Michael F. Hold (AUM)881.84%
||
|Ronald Earl Ansley
|-
|Lethbridge|||
|John C. Landeryou6,97560.05%
|
|Alan Cullen3,78632.60%
|
|
|
|James Taylor8207.06%
|
||||
|John C. Landeryou
|-
|Little Bow|||
|Raymond Albert Speaker3,36863.72%
|
|Arthur W. Ulrich64912.28%
|
|Douglas H. Galbraith1,24523.55%
|
|
|
||||
|Peter Dawson
|-
|Macleod|||
|James Hartley3,12764.57%
|
|
|
|Allie Streeter1,46630.27%
|
|John K. Head2384.91%
|
||||
|James Hartley
|-
|Medicine Hat|||
|Harry C. Leinweber4,95451.77%
|
|Helen Beny Gibson2,25923.61%
|
|Kenneth Roy Biddell1,48515.52%
|
|Milton J. Reinhardt8418.79%
|
||||
|Elizabeth G. Robinson
|-
|Okotoks-High River|||
|Edward P. Benoit2,36152.55%
|
|Robert E.G. Armstrong4489.97%
|
|Samuel Brown1,58535.28%
|
|Bill Steemson861.91%
|
||||
|Ernest G. Hansell
|-
|Olds-Didsbury|||
|Robert Curtis Clark3,95066.79%
|
|
|
|
|
|Eva Banta4006.76%
|
|Roger Lebeuf (AUM)1,55026.21%
||
|
|-
|Peace River|||
|Euell F. Montgomery2,78260.32%
|
|Vic. O'Reilly98021.25%
|
|Hall C. Sisson84218.26%
|
|
|
||||
|William F. Gilliland
|-
|Pembina|||
|Robin D. Jorgenson3,06755.78%
|
|Ray Brodeur84215.31%
|
|Percy Baxandall82314.97%
|
|Herman Hauch56210.22%
|
|Verdun Baxandall (Ind. SoCred)1653.00%|||
|Robin D. Jorgenson
|-
|Pincher Creek-Crowsnest|||
|William A. Kovach2,52454.30%
|
|Thomas J. Costigan53911.60%
|
|Frank Lynch-Staunton95320.50%
|
|Arthur Lees62113.36%
|
||||
|William A. Kovach
|-
|Ponoka|||
|Glen F. Johnston1,83044.56%
|
|
|
|
|
|
|
|Neville S. Roper (Ind. SoCred)1,72141.90%George F. Sharp (Ind.)52512.78%|||
|Glen F. Johnston
|-
|Red Deer|||
|William Kenneth Ure6,01657.57%
|
|Denis Yunker6095.83%
|
|Walter M. Ogilvie3,32331.80%
|
|Herman H. Dorin4464.27%
|
||||
|William Kenneth Ure
|-
|Redwater|||
|Michael Senych1,67041.61%
|
|Steve Romanchuk75518.81%
|
|Joe Bielish1,36233.94%
|
|William Glass2165.38%
|
||||
|John Dubetz
|-
|Rocky Mountain House|||
|Alfred J. Hooke3,17572.32%
|
|Ellis M. Bowen59113.46%
|
|
|
|Robert H. Carlyle59913.64%
|
||||
|Alfred J. Hooke
|-
|Sedgewick-Coronation|||
|Jack C. Hillman3,99967.72%
|
|James Leland Sims1,36823.17%
|
|
|
|Karl O. Peterson5298.96%
|
||||
|
|-
|Spirit River
|
|Lionel Lizee3838.68%|||
|Adolph O. Fimrite3,07769.73%
|
|
|
|Uri Powell94821.48%
|
||||
|Adolph O. Fimrite
|-
|St. Albert|||
|Keith Everitt2,54039.85%
|
|Louis Chalifoux2,03031.85%
|
|Alan Lazerte1,33220.90%
|
|Alan Bevington4517.08%
|
||||
|Keith Everitt
|-
|St. Paul|||
|Raymond Reierson2,88960.90%
|
|Rene P. Foisy1,36328.73%
|
|
|
|H.B. Hodgins2655.59%
|
|Daniel Gamache (Comm.)2154.53%
||
|Raymond Reierson
|-
|Stettler|||
|Galen C. Norris3,07668.02%
|
|Clark K. Burlingham1,06523.55%
|
|
|
|Joseph J. Tipman3698.16%
|
||||
|Galen C. Norris
|-
|Stony Plain|||
|Cornelia R. Wood2,71641.75%
|
|Harold McLaughlin1,92129.53%
|
|Peter Germaniuk90313.88%
|
|Conrad D. (Red) Fuhr3585.50%
|
|Rudolph Zander (AUM)5959.15%
||
|Cornelia R. Wood
|-
|Strathcona Centre|||
|Joseph Donovan Ross5,23258.39%
|
|Ian Nicoll2,41826.99%
|
|
|
|Harry J. Strynadka1,26214.08%
|
||||
|Joseph Donovan Ross
|-
|Strathcona East|||
|Ernest C. Manning6,84253.22%
|
|James A. Cox1,89014.70%
|
|Oscar H. Kruger2,63020.46%
|
|Dennis A. Wood1,45711.33%
|
||||
|Ernest C. Manning
|-
|Strathcona West|||
|Randolph H. McKinnon5,02947.47%
|
|Arthur W. Crossley2,55724.14%
|
|Arnold H. Lane1,86317.59%
|
|George R. Field9368.84%
|
||||
|Randolph H. McKinnon
|-
|Taber-Warner|||
|Leonard C. Halmrast0
|
|
|
|
|
|
|
||||
|
|-
|Three Hills|||
|Louis Petrie Meston3,38562.70%
|
|James A. Lore1,72832.01%
|
|
|
|John F. Kennan2574.76%
|
||||
|
|-
|Vegreville-Bruce|||
|Alex W. Gordey2,92550.03%
|
|Wilfrid L. Horton67511.55%
|
|Graham Allan1,19420.42%
|
|Albin Lukawiecki85114.56%
|
|Clarence A. Knies (Ind. SoCred)1893.23%|||
|
|-
|Vermilion|||
|Ashley H. Cooper2,96468.08%
|
|Arthur W. Roland83719.22%
|
|
|
|Edward I. Thompson54512.52%
|
||||
|Ashley H. Cooper
|-
|Wainwright|||
|Henry A. Ruste3,46576.25%
|
|John M. Saville66814.70%
|
|
|
|John Wesley Connelly3878.52%
|
||||
|Henry A. Ruste
|-
|Wetaskiwin|||
|Albert W. Strohschein3,33361.01%
|
|Albert (Butch) Dyberg1,29823.76%
|
|
|
|Leslie Pritchard82315.06%
|
||||
|John A. Wingblade
|-
|Willingdon-Two Hills|||
|Nicholas A. Melnyk2,31556.53%
|
|Allan Eschak2836.91%
|
|Walter Witwicky99324.25%
|
|William Glen Haley49612.11%
|
||||
|
|-
|}

See also
List of Canadian political parties

References

Further reading
 

Alberta
1963
1963 in Alberta
June 1963 events in Canada